The Boise State Broncos football program represents Boise State University in college football and competes in the NCAA Division I Football Bowl Subdivision (FBS) as a member of the Mountain West Conference. The Broncos play their home games on campus at Albertsons Stadium in Boise, Idaho, and their head coach is Andy Avalos. The program is 13–7 in bowl games since 1999, including a 3–0 record in the Fiesta Bowl. As of the end of the 2022 season, the Broncos' all-time winning percentage of .729 is the fifth highest in all of collegiate football.

History

Early history (1933–1975)
Originally a junior college, Boise State first fielded a football team in 1933 under head coach Dusty Kline. That team compiled a record of 1–2–1. Kline was succeeded by Max Eiden. Under Eiden, the Broncos posted a record of 11–17–1 from 1934 to 1937. Eiden was succeeded by Harry Jacoby, who coached the team from 1938 to the middle of the 1941 season before being called into Army service. The remainder of the 1941 season was coached by George "Stub" Allison, who posted a record of 2–1. The Broncos did not compete in intramural football from 1942 to 1945 due to having a reduced male student population during World War II. Following the war, Jacoby would return to coach the Broncos for one more season in 1946, posting a final record of 14–15–2. After a year as an assistant, Lyle Smith was promoted to head football coach of Boise Junior College in 1947. Smith saw incredible success as head coach, winning his first 31 games in a row as head coach. In 1950, the team moved into a new 10,000-seat stadium. With the outbreak of the Korean War, Smith, still undefeated as a head coach, was recalled to the Navy and was only able to coach in the first three games of the 1950 season. George Blankley assumed the head coaching duties for the remainder of 1950 and the entire 1951 season in Smith's absence and compiled a 16–2 record. Smith returned as head coach in 1952 and stretched his winning streak all the way to 37 games before suffering his first defeat. In 1954, Smith was a leading candidate for the vacant job at his alma mater Idaho, but withdrew his name from consideration, content at Boise. Boise won thirteen conference titles in football under Smith and the NJCAA National Football Championship in 1958. Smith's final record is 150–25–6. Coach Smith never had a losing season as the head coach. Boise State's football program moved up to four-year status in 1968 under new head coach Tony Knap and competed as an NAIA independent for two seasons. The Broncos were accepted into the NCAA in October 1969, and a month later into the Big Sky Conference, effective the following July. The Broncos began NCAA competition in 1970 in Division II ("College Division" prior to 1973) in a brand new Bronco Stadium. Knap and the Broncos won three consecutive Big Sky titles from 1973 to 1975 and compiled a record of 71–19–1.

Jim Criner era (1976–1982)
Knap was succeeded by Jim Criner in 1976, a defensive assistant the previous season under Dick Vermeil at UCLA, the Rose Bowl champions. BSU won the Big Sky again in 1977, and in 1978, the Broncos and the Big Sky moved up to the new Division I-AA (renamed FCS in 2006). A scouting violation late that season at NAU resulted in probation and compromised an excellent 10–1 season in 1979, undefeated in conference at 7–0; the Broncos were ineligible for the Big Sky title and I-AA playoffs. Off probation in 1980, BSU won its first national title, taking the I-AA national championship over defending champion Eastern Kentucky in Sacramento. A runner-up to Idaho State in the Big Sky in 1981, BSU hosted Eastern Kentucky in the I-AA semifinals, but lost, 17–23.

Lyle Setencich era (1983–1986)
Lyle Setencich was promoted from defensive coordinator to head coach of Boise State following Criner's departure. Under Setencich, Boise State posted a 24–20 record in four seasons. Setencich's final season in 1986, the first season of blue turf, saw the first losing campaign (5–6) for the Broncos football program in four decades, winning just one road game and losing the final two home games. He lost all four rivalry games against Idaho and resigned following the season.

Skip Hall era (1987–1992)
Skip Hall, previously an assistant coach under Don James at Washington, was hired after Setencich's resignation. In Hall's second season in 1988, the Broncos returned to the Division I-AA playoffs, their first appearance since 1981. Hall's best season was in 1990, when Boise State advanced to the national semifinals, falling in a high scoring game against Big Sky rival Nevada, the conference champion whom the Broncos had defeated a month earlier in Boise. Hall lost all six against Idaho; he resigned after six seasons, with a  record.

Pokey Allen era (1993–1996)
The Broncos turned to Portland State head coach Pokey Allen to lead the Boise State football team after Hall resigned. In Allen's second season, the Broncos returned to the championship game in 1994. After 26 years in the Big Sky, BSU joined the Big West Conference in 1996 and moved up to Division I-A (now FBS). The Broncos had an interim head coach for part of 1996 as Allen battled cancer. Allen died due to the cancer in December 1996.

Houston Nutt era (1997)
Head coach Houston Nutt made the step up to NCAA Division I-A the next year when Boise State hired him away from Murray State to take over the program. Two years after making the Division I-AA finals in 1994, Boise State's first year in Division I-A had been difficult and was looking for a recruiter and motivator to jump start their program following Allen's death. Nutt's team posted a 5–6 record in 1997, playing at the Division I-A level with its Division I-AA players. Nutt's team beat rival Idaho on the road in overtime for the first BSU win in Moscow since 1981. Additionally, Boise State almost pulled off an upset against Wisconsin of the Big Ten. Nutt resigned as head coach after just one season to accept the head football coach position at Arkansas.

Dirk Koetter era (1998–2000)
In three seasons under head coach Dirk Koetter, who previously served as Oregon's offensive coordinator, the Broncos were 26–10, won two Big West championships and moved to the Western Athletic Conference effective in 2001. In his three winning seasons at Boise State, Koetter won ten or more games twice, with two bowl wins. Koetter departed the Broncos after the 2000 season for Arizona State in the Pac-10.

Dan Hawkins era (2001–2005)
Dan Hawkins was promoted from offensive coordinator to head coach on December 2, 2000. In 2004, Hawkins was honored with his second Western Athletic Conference (WAC) Coach of the Year title in three years. Through the 2005 season, he compiled a 53–11 record as Boise State's head coach, including a 37–3 record in WAC competition with four straight WAC titles. Only Walter Camp, George Washington Woodruff and Bob Pruett had more total wins in their first five years of head coaching. He holds a 31–game WAC winning streak, the longest in conference history. One of his first hires at Boise State was Chris Petersen as his offensive coordinator; Petersen was a quarterback at UC Davis while Hawkins was an assistant coach, and was the wide receivers coach at Oregon under head coach Mike Bellotti. After five seasons at the helm of the Broncos football program, Hawkins left for Colorado of the Big 12 Conference. He had three top 25 finishes, won ten or more games three times, and won two bowl games.

Chris Petersen era (2006–2013)

Following Hawkins' departure, offensive coordinator Chris Petersen was promoted to head coach. At Boise State, Petersen won two Paul "Bear" Bryant National Coach of the Year Awards, voted on by the National Sportscasters and Sportswriters Association. He is the first coach to receive this award twice, which debuted in 1986 (it has since been awarded twice to Nick Saban and three times to Dabo Swinney). Under Petersen, Boise State recorded two undefeated seasons, three undefeated regular seasons, and reached the Bowl Championship Series twice. The 2006 season was capped with a memorable upset of Oklahoma in the Fiesta Bowl, while the 2009 team defeated TCU in the Fiesta Bowl to finish at 14–0 and were fourth in both major polls. They were just the second team ever to go 14–0 in the history of major college football. Petersen brought Boise State football its highest ranking during the 2010 season. The team rose to second in the Associated Press poll during weeks 7, 8, and 9, and No. 2 in the Coaches' Poll, as well as earning the No. 3 slot in the first BCS ranking. After 2010, Boise State joined the Mountain West Conference.

In May 2011, Boise State Athletics was cited by the NCAA for "lack of institutional control," for one major violation in women's tennis and several minor violations in four sports, including football. While the football program's violations were minor (student athletes provided fellow recruits with meals and beds while visiting campus), the football program suffered serious penalties nonetheless. The Boise State football program was given three years' probation, lost three scholarships a year, and had its number of Fall practices reduced. As a result of the NCAA violations, Gene Bleymaier, the athletic director who brought blue turf to Boise State in 1986 and promoted Petersen 20 years later, was asked to resign, and ultimately fired when he refused. Despite President Bob Kustra's firing of Bleymaier, boosters continued to support him. Just two years later, the new football facility was named in his honor.

Between 2008 and 2011, the Broncos went 50–3 to become the first FBS team to win 50 games over a four-year span. With the 50–3 record, quarterback Kellen Moore became the winningest quarterback in FBS history, passing former Texas quarterback Colt McCoy (45 wins). On December 7, 2011, it was announced that the Broncos would join the Big East Conference as football-only members in July 2013, in a division with Memphis, SMU, Houston, San Diego State, and Temple. However, the following year Boise State announced they had decided to stay in the Mountain West Conference, leaving the Big East without ever playing a game in the conference. Petersen accepted the head coaching position at the University of Washington of the Pac-12 Conference on December 6, 2013. The vacancy was created when the Huskies' Steve Sarkisian left to take the head coaching position at USC. He was at BSU for a total of 13 years, the first five as offensive coordinator under Hawkins. Assistant head coach Bob Gregory was named interim head coach for Boise State's bowl game.

Bryan Harsin era (2014–2020)
On December 11, 2013, Arkansas State head coach Bryan Harsin returned to his alma mater as Petersen's replacement. Harsin had been an assistant for the Broncos under Petersen and was co-offensive coordinator at Texas under Mack Brown. In his first season in 2014, they went 10–2 in the regular season and won the Mountain West Championship Game, defeating Fresno State 28–14. This was Boise State's first outright Mountain West Conference championship. The Broncos faced the Arizona Wildcats in the Fiesta Bowl and won 38–30 for a 12–2 record and were ranked 15th in both major polls. Boise State shared the Mountain division title in 2016, going 10–3 with wins over Washington State and Oregon State. BSU was 11–3 in 2017 and won their second Mountain west conference championship under Harsin with a 17–14 win over Fresno State in the Mountain West Championship Game. Boise State capped the season with a Las Vegas Bowl win over Oregon and climbed to 22nd in both final polls. In 2018, Boise State was 10–3 overall; they won the Mountain Division championship and beat three teams that won ten or more games (Troy, Utah State, and Fresno State) and were ranked in both final polls. In 2019 Boise State went 12–2 won the opener at Florida State went 8–0 in the Mountain West conference play for the first time in the regular season, won the Mountain Division and won the conference championship 31–10 vs Hawaii and finished ranked in both final polls. Under Harsin, Boise State is  through 2020, with at least nine wins per year, a 3–2 record in bowl games, won three conference titles, five division titles, and have been in the AP final poll four times. On December 22, 2020, Harsin resigned to become the head coach at Auburn. He finished at Boise State with a seven-year record of 69–19.

Andy Avalos era (2021–present)
On January 8, 2021, Boise State hired Oregon defensive coordinator Andy Avalos as their new head coach. Avalos, a former player and assistant coach for the Broncos, signed a five-year contract worth $7.75 million.

Head coaches
Head coaching records since Boise State became a four-year school in 1968.

^ Mason was the interim head coach for the first 10 games of the 1996 season while head coach Pokey Allen battled cancer.* Gregory was the interim head coach after Petersen took the job at Washington.! Ties eliminated after the addition of overtime in 1996—Big Sky began overtime for conference games in 1980
 NAIA (1968–69), NCAA Division II (1970–77), Division I-AA (1978–95), Division I-A/FBS (1996–present)

Championships

National championships
Boise State Claims two national titles in the Junior College Division and at the NCAA Division I FCS.

Conference championships

§ – Conference co–champions
 The 1979 team went 7–0 and 10–1 overall, but they were on probation, thus they were not officially awarded a conference title.

Division titles

 – Division co–champions, did not play in MW Championship Game.

* Season still in progress, division title already clinched.

Mountain West Championship Game

Postseason results

Division I-A/FBS bowl game appearances
The Broncos have appeared in 20 official D-I-A bowl games with a record of 13–7, including two wins in BCS bowl games and one win in a New Year's Six bowl. They also appears in the Division II 1973 Pioneer Bowl, 1971 Camellia Bowl and 1980 Camellia Bowl. Their appearance in the 2018 First Responder Bowl was ruled a no contest after being canceled due to inclement weather. On December 5th, 2021,  Boise State received a bid to play Central Michigan in the Arizona Bowl. However, On December 27, 2022, Barstool Sports (the title sponsor of the bowl) founder David Portnoy announced the withdrawal of the Broncos from the bowl due to COVID-19 issues within the program. Through the 2019 season, Boise State is tied with Wisconsin with 18 straight bowl games which is the 4th longest active bowl streak in the country behind Georgia, Oklahoma and LSU.

Division I-AA Playoffs results
The Broncos were members of Division I-AA for eighteen seasons, from its inception in 1978 through 1995. They appeared in the I-AA playoffs five times with a record of 8–4, and were I-AA national champions in 1980.

Division II Playoffs results
The Broncos appeared in the Division II playoffs three times, with an overall record of 1–3; all three losses were to the eventual national champions.

In 1977, Boise State (9–2) was undefeated in the Big Sky (6–0) and won another title. Due their regular season not ending until November 26 at Idaho, the same day as the first round of the Division II playoffs, BSU was replaced by runner-up Northern Arizona, who lost 35–0 at home.

College Division Postseason results
The Broncos had one appearance in the NCAA College Division postseason, with a victory in the West regional final in the Camellia Bowl in 1971. No semifinals or finals were played in the College Division from 1964 through 1972, a poll followed the four quarterfinals.

Top 25 Finishes

Albertsons Stadium

Since 1970, Boise State has played its home games in Albertsons Stadium (known as Bronco Stadium from 1970 to May 2014), which enjoys a reputation as one of the most difficult places in the country for opposing teams to play. The stadium is well known for its blue artificial surface, which was first installed in 1986 making it the first college stadium field to be any color other than traditional green, as well as the only college to have a non-green field for 22 years (1986–2008). "The Blue," as it is called by fans, is one of the most distinguishing and enduring symbols of Boise State football. Boise State holds a trademark on any non-green field, not just blue. Therefore, anyone (high school, college, or otherwise) must apply for a license from Boise State before installing a football field any color other than green. Boise State is one of 7 college football programs in the United States to have a non-green playing surface. Other schools with non-green fields are as follows: (FBS) Eastern Michigan University (Gray), Coastal Carolina University (Teal), (FCS) Eastern Washington University (Red), the University of Central Arkansas (Grey and Purple), (Division II) the University of New Haven (Blue), (NAIA) Lindenwood University (Red and Grey). Hosei University in Tokyo, Japan also has a blue football field. Boise State recently approved the proposal for a blue field at Luther College (Division III). As of December 7, 2019, the Broncos are 128–9 at home since the 1999 season. The Broncos won 47 straight home conference games from 1999 to 2011 and were undefeated at home in conference play during their 10 years in the WAC (40–0). The Broncos are 122–7 in regular season home games since 1999, and had a winning streak of 65 regular season games from 2001 to 2011. Their current home winning streak stands at 0.

Blue uniform ban
In 2011, citing a "competitive advantage," the Mountain West Conference banned Boise State from wearing their all-blue uniforms for home conference games as a condition of joining the conference. When questioned about the ban, Mountain West Commissioner Craig Thompson confirmed that either the jerseys or pants could be blue, provided that the other be white or orange. After Boise State decided to not join the Big East Conference and remain in the Mountain West the uniform restrictions were lifted beginning in the 2013 season. The NCAA considered a rule that would have required a team's uniform, either jersey or pants, to contrast the playing surface. The rule would have banned Boise State's all blue uniforms at home and most other teams from wearing all green uniforms as well. The NCAA eventually decided against instituting the rule.

Hosei Tomahawks

In 2012, Boise State granted special permission and an international trademark to Hosei University in Tokyo, Japan for use of the blue field turf for their football field, Tomahawks Field.

Rivalries

Fresno State

BSU has had a rivalry with Fresno State University since joining the WAC. The series is 17–8 all time in favor of Boise State. In 2001, the series became a WAC match-up, christened with Boise State's upset over No. 8 Fresno State 35–30. In 2005, the series became the Battle for the Milk Can, and No. 20 Fresno State ended Boise State's 31-game winning streak against WAC opponents with their 27–7 victory. After being played as a non-conference game in 2011, the series continued as a conference game in 2012. The winner of the game receives the Milk Can. Although Fresno State has five all-time wins over Boise State, only two wins have come since they have played each other every year since 2001. In the 2014 season, Boise State played Fresno State twice, winning both times, the second one coming in the Mountain West Championship, which Boise State won for the first time. Fresno State was looking to repeat as champions. They met twice in 2017 in back-to-back weeks as they ended the regular season with a game in Fresno, which Fresno won, before meeting the next week in the Mountain West Championship in Boise, which Boise won. In 2018, Boise State upset No. 16 Fresno State 24–17 to end Fresno's seven game winning streak. Three weeks later, the Bulldogs avenged their regular season loss by defeating Boise State 19–16 in overtime in a snow covered Mountain West Championship Game.

The rivalry is no longer an annual affair following the expansion of the MW to 12 football members in 2013. At that time, Boise State and Fresno State were placed in separate football divisions (respectively, Mountain and West). As part of the new scheduling arrangement, all cross-divisional games rotate in a four-year cycle, with two years of play followed by two years off. This in turn means that the game was not played in 2015 or 2016.

Idaho

Boise State had a 40-year in-state rivalry with the University of Idaho, which began with a Bronco victory in the first meeting in 1971. They met every year through 2010, and with the exception of four years (2001–2004), the matchup was a conference game. The rivalry was dominated by streaks as Idaho won 12 straight years from 1982 to 1993, while Boise State won the most recent 12 games between 1999 and 2010, mostly by large margins. BSU leads the rivalry with a series record of 22–17–1 (.563).

After Boise State's move to the Mountain West Conference in 2011, Boise State has refused to play Idaho home and home in football. As a response, Idaho has refused to play Boise State at ExtraMile Arena for men's basketball. As of 2021, no future games for football or men's basketball have been scheduled; with Idaho having returned to FCS football in 2018, the football rivalry is unlikely to resume in the foreseeable future.

Nevada

Boise State has a long-standing rivalry with Nevada. Boise State leads the series 30–13. Boise State and Nevada have been conference rivals in the Big Sky Conference, the Big West Conference, the WAC, and the Mountain West. However, the series is no longer an annual affair after the 2013 expansion, as Nevada was placed in the opposite division from Boise State. They play each other only twice every four years. The last game was in 2018 with the next game coming in 2021.

The series was played as a non-conference game in 2011 as the teams met in Boise during Nevada's last year in the WAC. Nevada split the WAC championship with Boise State in 2005 as both teams finished 7–1 in conference play. Boise State beat Nevada in the last game of the season in 2006, giving Boise State a berth into their first BCS bowl. In 2007, in one of the highest scoring games in NCAA Division I football history, Boise State defeated Nevada 69–67 in four overtimes. Recently, the conference championship has been decided by the Wolf Pack and Broncos' late-season games. In 2010, Nevada defeated No. 3 Boise State 34–31 in overtime, ending the Broncos' BCS National Championship hopes. The rivalry between the two schools felt as if it had been rekindled after Nevada's win, since Boise State had won the past 10 games dating back to 1998. Boise State and Nevada have played one time in the postseason in the 1990 I-AA semifinal. Nevada won the game in triple overtime 59–52, and would go on to lose in the final.

All-time record vs. Mountain West teams

Future scheduled non-conference games
Announced schedules as of July 11, 2022.

Notable honors

College Football Hall of Famers

Players
Randy Trautman – DT, 1978–81

Pro Football Hall of Famers

Players
Dave Wilcox – LB 1960–62 inducted 2000

Individual awards

Kellen Moore Award

Previously called the Quarterback of the Year Award, this accolade differs from Sammy Baugh Trophy in that it goes to top quarterback, rather than the top passer. Its name was changed to its current identity in 2012, honoring two-time winner Kellen Moore, who became the FBS all-time leader in wins by a quarterback after going 50–3 as the starter at Boise State.

Sports Illustrated All-Decade Team
Ryan Clady, OT

Bobby Dodd Coach of the Year Award
Chris Petersen (2010)

Paul "Bear" Bryant Award
Chris Petersen (2006)
Chris Petersen (2009)

AP All-Americans
Avery Williams, 2020 First-Team All-Purpose/Return Specialist
Darian Thompson, 2015 3rd team S
Jay Ajayi, 2014 3rd team RB (2nd team on USA Today)
Titus Young, 2010 3rd team WR
Kellen Moore, 2009 3rd team QB & 2010 3rd team QB
Ryan Clady, 2007 Consensus All-American LT
Ian Johnson, 2006 3rd team RB (1st team on SI, 2nd team on Sporting News)
Markus Koch, 1985 1st team DE & 1983 1st team DT
John Rade, 1982 1st team DE & 1981 2nd team LB
Randy Trautman, 1981 & 1980 1st team DT
Rick Woods, 1981 2nd team SS
Cedric Minter, 1980 2nd team & 1978 3rd team RB
Nate Potter, 2011 Consensus All-American LT

Notable players
Dave Wilcox – LB, BSU 1960–62 (Boise Junior College)
Jerry Inman – DL, BSU 1962–63 (Boise Junior College)
Eric Guthrie – QB, BSU 1968–71
Jim McMillian – QB, BSU 1972–1974
Roland "Rollie" Woolsey – DB, BSU 1972–74
David Hughes – FB, BSU 1977–80
Cedric Minter – RB, BSU 1977–80
Rick Woods – S/PR, BSU 1978–81
John Rade – LB, BSU 1979–82
Randy Trautman – DT, BSU 1980–81
Michel Bourgeau – DT, BSU 1980–83
Markus Koch – DE, BSU 1982–85
Jon Francis – RB, BSU 1982–85
Chuck Compton – DB, BSU 1984–86
Terry Heffner-WR, BSU 1986-90
Bart Hull – RB, BSU 1988–90
Frank Robinson – CB, BSU 1988–91
Scott Monk – LB, BSU 1989–95
Kimo Von Oelhoffen – DT, BSU 1992–93
Bryan Johnson – FB, BSU 1996–99
Bryan Harsin QB, BSU 1995–99
Shaunard Harts – S, BSU 1997–2000
Bart Hendricks – QB, BSU 1997–2000
Brock Forsey – RB, BSU 1998–2002, NFL 2003–05, (2003) 6th Round, 206th Pick Overall to Chicago Bears. Chicago Bears (2003), Miami Dolphins (2004), Washington Redskins (2005)
Jeb Putzier – TE, BSU 1998–2001, NFL 2003–07, (2002) 6th Round, 191st Pick Overall to Denver Broncos. Denver Broncos (2003–05, 2008), Houston Texans (2006–07), Seattle Seahawks (2008), UFL 2010, Hartford Colonials (2010), Omaha Nighthawks (2010)
Ryan Dinwiddie – QB, BSU 2000–03
Tim Gilligan – WR, BSU 2000–03
Chris Carr – CB, BSU 2001–04, (2005) UDFA, NFL 2005–13, Oakland Raiders (2005–07), Tennessee Titans (2008), Baltimore Ravens (2009–11), Minnesota Vikings (2012), San Diego Chargers (2012), New Orleans Saints (2013)
Daryn Colledge – OG, BSU 2001–05, NFL 2006–14, (2006) 2nd Round, 47th Pick Overall, Green Bay Packers (2006–14), Arizona Cardinals (2011–13), Miami Dolphins (2014)
Alex Guerrero – DL, BSU 2002–05
Gerald Alexander – S, BSU 2003–06, NFL 2007–11, (2007) 2nd Round, 61st Pick Overall, Detroit Lions (2007–08), Jacksonville Jaguars (2009–10), Miami Dolphins (2011), New York Jets (2011)
Jared Zabransky – QB, BSU 2003–06, NFL 2007–08, CFL 2009–10, (2007) UDFA, Houston Texans (2007), Pittsburgh Steelers (2008), Edmonton Eskimos (2009–10)
Derek Schouman – TE, 7th round, pick 222, BSU 2003–06, NFL 2007–10, Buffalo Bills (2007–09), St. Louis Rams (2010)
Ryan Clady – RT/LT, 1st round, pick 12, BSU 2004–07, NFL 2008–16, Denver Broncos (2008–15), New York Jets (2016)
Vinny Perretta – WR, BSU 2005–08
Kyle Brotzman – K, BSU 2007–10
Ryan Winterswyk – DE/TE, BSU 2007–10
Titus Young – WR, 2nd round, pick 44, BSU 2007–2010, Detroit Lions 2011–2012, St. Louis Rams 2012
Austin Pettis- WR, 3rd round, pick 78, BSU 2007–2010, St. Louis Rams 2011–2014, San Diego Chargers 2015
Ricky Tjong-A-Tjoe – DT, BSU 2009–13
Matt Paradis – Center, BSU 2009–13, 6th round, pick 207, Denver Broncos 2014–2018 Super Bowl Champion (50), Carolina Panthers 2019–present
Tyler Shoemaker – WR/TE, BSU 2009–12, NFL 2012–13, CFL 2014–16, (2012) UDFA, Tampa Bay Buccaneers (2012), Kansas City Chiefs (2013), Ottawa Redblacks (2014–15)
Doug Martin – RB, 1st round, pick 31, BSU 2007–2011, Tampa Bay Buccaneers 2012–2017, Oakland Raiders 2018
Shea McClellin – LB, 1st round, pick 19, BSU 2008–2011, Chicago Bears 2012–2015, New England Patriots 2016–2017
Kellen Moore – QB, BSU 2008–11, NFL 2012–2016, Dallas Cowboys offensive coordinator (2019–present)
DeMarcus Lawrence – All-Pro Defensive End for the Dallas Cowboys, BSU (2012–13), 2nd round, pick 34
Tyrone Crawford – DL, Dallas Cowboys, BSU (2010–11), 3rd round, pick 81. 
Leighton Vander Esch – 1st round, pick 19 All-Pro Linebacker for the Dallas Cowboys, BSU (2014–17)
Orlando Scandrick – CB, 5th round, pick 143 Dallas Cowboys (2008–2017), Washington Redskins (2018), Kansas City Chiefs (2018), Philadelphia Eagles (2019), BSU (2005–07)
Jay Ajayi – RB, BSU (2011–2014) 5th round, pick 149 Miami Dolphins (2015–2017), Philadelphia Eagles (2017–2019)
Tyler Rausa – K, BSU (2013–2016) Columbus Lions (2018), Massachusetts Pirates (2019), DC Defenders (2020)
Jeremy McNichols – RB, BSU (2014–2016) 5th round, pick 162 Tampa Bay Buccaneers (2017), San Francisco 49ers (2017), Indianapolis Colts (2018), Denver Broncos (2018), Tennessee Titans (2018), Chicago Bears (2019), Jacksonville Jaguars (2019), Tennessee Titans (2020–present)
Brett Rypien – QB, BSU (2015–2018), UDFA, Denver Broncos (2019–Present)
Cedrick Wilson Jr. – WR, BSU (2016–2017), 6th round, 208th pick Dallas Cowboys (2018–present)
Alexander Mattison – RB, 3rd round, pick 102 BSU (2016–2018), Minnesota Vikings, (2019–present)
Ezra Cleveland – OT, BSU (2016–2019), 2nd Round, Pick 58 Minnesota Vikings (2020–present)
John Hightower – WR, BSU (2018–2019), 5th round, Pick 168 Philadelphia Eagles (2020–present)
Curtis Weaver – OLB, BSU (2016–2019), 5th round, Pick 164 Miami Dolphins (2020), Cleveland Browns (2020–2022), Seattle Sea Dragons (2023–present)
John Bates – TE, BSU (2016–2020), 4th round, pick 124 Washington Football Team (2021–present)
Avery Williams – CB, BSU (2016–2020), 5th round, pick 183 Atlanta Falcons (2021–present)
Khalil Shakir- WR, BSU (2018–2021), 5th round, Pick 148 Buffalo Bills (2022–present)

See also

References

External links

 

 
American football teams established in 1933
1933 establishments in Idaho